Pay-ye Sorkh (also Romanized as Pāy-ye Sorkh) is a village in Gavkan Rural District, in the Central District of Rigan County, Kerman Province, Iran. At the 2006 census, its population was 36, in 7 families.

References 

Populated places in Rigan County